When We Were Young was a number one hit single by the Irish Showband The Airchords, featuring Pat Lynch on lead vocals. It reached No.1 on the Irish Singles Chart on 10 April 1971. The song remained at the top of the charts for just the one week, but was to return to the No.1 position on 8 May of that same year, this time for a period of four weeks.

Irish songs
1971 singles
Song articles with missing songwriters